JMJ may refer to:

 An abbreviation for the Holy Family (consisting of Jesus, Mary, and Joseph), printed by Christians on the top of letters and other places
 IATA code for Lancang Jingmai Airport
 Jam Master Jay, (1965–2002), American musician and rapper
 Jam Master Jay Records, an American record label
 Jean-Michel Jarre (born 1948), French composer and producer
 Justin Meldal-Johnsen (born 1970), American musician
 World Youth Day (French: , Spanish ,)